Agnieszka Brzezanska (born 1972, in Gdańsk) is a Polish artist based in Warsaw. She uses paint and video to imply narrative and significance in ordinary objects.

Selected exhibitions

2007
Les Rencontres d'Arles festival (Laureate to the Discovery Award)

2006
Tunnel like a Tail, Hotel, London
Farewell to Icon, Anna Helwing Gallery, Los Angeles
Housewarming, Swiss Institute, New York City
Warsaw for Amateurs, Zacheta National Art Gallery, Warsaw
All dressed up with Nowhere to go..., Sorcha Dallas, Glasgow
MACO, Mexico City

2005
Is nothing not enough? Broadway 1602, New York City
dharma tv, Kunstlerhaus Buchsenhausen, Innsbruck

2004
ap4, Geneva

2003
Agnieszka Brzezanska and Janos Fodor, Platan Gallery, Budapest

1997
It is beneficial to cross a big water, CCA Ujazdowski Castle, Warsaw

References

External links
Sam Thorne, Agnieszka Brzezańska at Hotel, London at frieze.com
Images, biography, texts at the Saatchi Gallery]
Agnieszka Brzezanska at ArtFacts.net
Agnieszka Brzezanska at culture.pl

1972 births
Living people
Artists from Warsaw
Artists from Gdańsk